The Fick Observatory was an astronomical observatory owned and operated by Iowa State University. Located southwest of Boone, Iowa it was named after Davenport, Iowa amateur astronomer Erwin W. Fick. The observatory closed in 2015.

History
Iowa State University’s original telescope and observatory, located northwest of Ames, was donated by the family of Milo Mather of Clarksville, Iowa, following his death in 1960.  Mather was an accomplished amateur astronomer and mechanical engineering graduate (1907) of Iowa State.  In 1970, the mirror from his telescope was reconditioned and used in a newly reconfigured telescope, also named after Mather, and installed in the Erwin W. Fick Observatory.

Iowa State built the Fick Observatory southwest of Boone, Iowa, in 1970. The facility was named after Erwin W. Fick (1897–1975), an amateur astronomer and retired member of the U.S. Corps of Engineers from Davenport, Iowa. Though Fick had never been to Ames, let alone graduated from Iowa State, he set up a trust through the ISU Foundation to help support Iowa State’s observatory. New imaging devices, such as the CCD (charge-coupled device) camera installed in 1990, and the short focal length of the telescope allowed researchers to obtain wide-field views of the sky to very faint limits. Measurements gathered by the Mather telescope could be used to complement data obtained by larger observatories, which often sacrifice wide views for fine detail. Over the years, Iowa State researchers used the Fick Observatory for a wide variety of studies, including stellar radial velocity observations, studies of ring galaxy collisions, and lunar occultation studies.

In 2015, the Erwin W. Fick Observatory closed.  It was the last astronomical research observatory operated by a college or university at a dark-sky site in the state of Iowa.

On April 1st, 2020, the Observatory and surrounding land (45.31 acres) was sold to Aaron Gillett for the price of $339,870.31 sadly closing the observatory for good.

Equipment
 0.6 meter Cassegrain reflector, Mather telescope
 8.5-meter parabolic dish antenna, Radio telescope
 Meade 14-inch Cassegrain reflector telescope
 Meade 10-inch Cassegrain reflector telescope
 Two Meade 8-inch Cassegrain reflector telescopes

See also
 List of observatories

References

External links
 Description
 Fick Observatory Clear Sky Chart - Forecasts of observing conditions
 Going dark: ISU abandoning the Fick Observatory 

1970 establishments in Iowa
Astronomical observatories in Iowa
Buildings and structures in Boone County, Iowa
Iowa State University